Seven is second internationally released album in 2003 by the Turkish pop singer Mustafa Sandal and his seventh album.

In 2004, the album was re-released under the title Seven New Version. This was his third internationally released album.

Track listing
 Seven, 2003
"Gel Aşkım"  –  – 3:53
"All My Life"  –  – 3:42
"Aya Benzer 2003"  –  – 3:58
"Kopmam Lazım (Retro Version)"  –  – 4:02
"Fıkra"  –  – 4:19
"Araba 2004"  –  – 4:48
"Story"  –  – 3:44
"Knife"  –  – 4:19
"She's in Love"  –  – 2:50
"Moonlight"  –  – 3:58
"Aşka Yürek Gerek (Solo Version)"  –  – 4:27
"Suç Bende (Magic Version)"  –  – 4:32
"Bonus Track" –  – 4.19

 Seven New Version, 2004
"Gel Aşkım"  –  – 3:53
"All My Life"  –  – 3:42
"Aya Benzer (Moonlight)"  –  – 3:58
"Kopmam Lazım (Retro Version)"  –  – 4:02
"Fıkra"  –  – 4:19
"Araba (Single Version)"  –  – 3:51
"Story"  –  – 3:44
"Knife"  –  – 4:19
"Moonlight (feat. Gülcan)"  –  – 3:58
"No Name"  –  – 4:38

Credits
 Music direction, arrangements: Bülent Aris
 Mixing: Bülent Aris
 Publishing: Polydor Island Group
 Photography: Zeynel Abidin

Music videos
 "Gel Aşkım"
 "All My Life"
 "Araba"

Notes

External links
 Mustafa Sandal Seven album at mp3music.ru

Mustafa Sandal albums
2003 albums